Juodkiškiai (formerly) is a hamlet in Kėdainiai district municipality, in Kaunas County, in central Lithuania. According to the 2011 census, the hamlet was uninhabited. It is located next to the eastern limit of Kėdainiai city, by the Obelis river and the Juodkiškiai Reservoir.

At the end of the 19th century, it was a folwark and watermill (built in 1859) of the Wędziagołski family. It was shortly a selsovet center during the Soviet era. Main part of the developing village was merged with Kėdainiai in the 1970s (nowadays the Juodkiškiai Street).

Demography

References

Villages in Kaunas County
Kėdainiai District Municipality